The Eleventh Amendment Bill to the Constitution of Pakistan (Urdu: آئین پاکستان میں گیارہویں ترمیم) was presented in the Senate on 31 August 1989. It was moved by Senators Mr. Muhammad Ali Khan, Dr. Noor Jehan Panezai and Syed Faseih Iqbal. The Amendment sought to restore the seats for Women in National Assembly to 20. The bill was later withdrawn after the Government gave assurance that they intend to introduce the same bill themselves soon.

Text

See also
 Zia-ul-Haq's Islamization
 Separation of powers
 Nawaz Sharif
 Benazir Bhutto
 Pervez Musharraf
 Amendments to the Constitution of Pakistan

References

Dear All,
 
Please note that the domain name of our website on the Constitution of Pakistan, 1973 has now been changed from “pakistanconstitutionlaw.com” to :
 
“pakistanconstitutionlaws.com”.
 
  
CONSTITUTION OF
THE ISLAMIC REPUBLIC OF PAKISTAN, 1973
As Amended by The Constitution Twenty Fifth Amendment Act, 2018
(Full Text and Case Law)

External links
 Full-text of the Eleventh Amendment

01